Song for Africa – Rwanda: Rises Up! is a Canadian charity album by the Song for Africa organization. The album is an accompanying soundtrack to the charity fund's latest Rwanda documentary which documents the visit to Rwanda by the Canadian super group of Steve Bays of Hot Hot Heat, Tim Edwards of Crash Parallel, Sarah Slean, Damhnait Doyle and John-Angus MacDonald of the Trews. Other Canadian artists featured on the album include Ian D'Sa of Billy Talent, Operation M.D., Classified, Luke McMaster, Mike Boyd, White Mic and Grand Analog.

The album was recorded in early 2010, and was released on iTunes only on June 15, 2010, following the release of the documentary on June 12, 2010.

Track listing

References

External links
 Official website

Charity albums
2010 compilation albums